Anolis cupreus, the copper anole, is a species of lizard in the family Dactyloidae. The species is found in Honduras, Nicaragua, and Costa Rica.

References

Anoles
Reptiles described in 1860
Taxa named by Edward Hallowell (herpetologist)
Reptiles of Honduras
Reptiles of Nicaragua
Reptiles of Costa Rica